Pseudoiulia is a genus of Cambrian arthropod known from the Chengjiang Biota of Yunnan, China, containing the single species P. cambriensis. It is considered poorly known, but has been somewhat associated with other Chengjiang Biota fauna such as Dongshania folliformis and Pissinocaris subconigera. In 2013, Pseudoiulia was suggested to be a member of the family Kootenichelidae, alongside Kootenichela and Worthenella.

See also

 Arthropod
 Cambrian explosion
 Chengjiang biota
 List of Chengjiang Biota species by phylum

References

Cambrian animals
Maotianshan shales fossils
Prehistoric arthropod genera